Karen's Diner is an Australian chain of theme restaurants. The restaurant advertises a deliberately unpleasant dining experience, and staff are instructed to insult customers throughout their meal. The restaurant's name comes from the internet slang term Karen, used to describe an older white woman who is stereotypically rude.

History 
The chain was established in Sydney, Australia in 2021 by Aden Levin and James Farrell. It is a theme restaurant based around the concept of an unpleasant dining experience where customers pay for employees to insult them. The restaurant was originally planned to be a six-month pop-up restaurant at World Square. The restaurant's concept initially drew a mixed response, raising concerns about whether the environment of mutual insults could expose employees to abuse by customers.

The name Karen's is a reference to the use of the name Karen in internet memes to describe a stereotypically rude or entitled middle-aged white woman. Staff are instructed to put on an abrasive persona and comically ridicule customers during their meal. Customers are expected to return this behavior by acting rudely towards the staff. However, customers and staff are prohibited from using insults based on racism, sexism or homophobia. Many of these exchanges include profanity, and people under the age of 16 must be accompanied by adults. Patrons who have ID showing that their name is Karen can receive a free drink.

The restaurant is based around American diners in the 1950s, and the menu features hamburgers and chicken wings. It became a popular source of content for social media, particularly on platform TikTok, as customers posted videos of their interactions with staff. The chain has opened locations in the United Kingdom, the United States, Indonesia, and New Zealand.

In August 2022, the restaurant drew controversy after a video allegedly showing a staff member at a Brisbane location behaving inappropriately went viral on TikTok. In the video, the server makes inappropriate remarks about an underage patron and accuses her father, who was dining with her, of being a pedophile. A spokesperson for the chain said that they were "disappointed" by the behavior and that the incident went against their guidelines.

See also 

 Dick's Last Resort
 The Wieners Circle

References

External links

2021 establishments in Australia
Restaurants established in 2021
Restaurant chains in Australia
Theme restaurants
Fast-food hamburger restaurants
Food and drink companies based in Sydney
Diners
2022 controversies